The Redemption is a 1936 novel by F. J. Thwaites. It was his ninth novel.

Plot
Terry Gordon, second officer on a mail steamer, loses his job due to the influence of a beautiful girl. He hits rock bottom but finds redemption through the help of another woman.

Reception
According to one critic:
Speed is not impairing the work of this young Australian author, neither is he skimping words in order to get each book finished. This one has more than 300 pages, and in spite of a rather obvious ending holds the interest all the way. 'The Redemption' has many passages reminiscent of 'Broken Wings' and 'The Mad Doctor,' and the general theme, too, is not original. But the setting is different and the treatment more mature, showing a keener understanding of human beings.

References

External links
The Redemption at AustLit

1936 Australian novels
Australian romance novels